Anoplophora is a genus of beetles in the longhorn beetle family (Cerambycidae). They are native to Asia. Most are large and colorful and thus are depicted in artwork and sought after by beetle collectors. The genus also includes several notorious pest insects.

Description
Beetles of Anoplophora are 1 to 5 centimeters in length. They are spotted or banded with a range of color patterns in shades of yellow, blue, purple, and white. They have very long antennae. One characteristic that is particularly useful for distinguishing the species from one another is the structure of the male genitalia.

Impacts
Several Anoplophora species are major pests of urban, ornamental, and agricultural trees.

The Asian long-horned beetle (A. glabripennis) is native to China and Korea, and it is now widespread in Europe as an introduced species. Populations of this beetle have been detected in some locations in North America, including Toronto, Chicago, New Jersey, Ohio, Massachusetts, and New York City, and have either been declared eradicated, or are currently being dealt with under an eradication program. Many tree species can serve as hosts to the beetle, but it especially favors maples.

The citrus long-horned beetle (A. chinensis; syn. A. malasiaca) has been introduced from Asia to Europe and North America. It is a pest of citrus and other fruit and nut trees. It infests forest trees and ornamentals. It attacks over 100 species of trees, shrubs, and herbs from many plant families. Damage from its wood-boring larvae can kill trees.

Diversity
In a 2002 revision of the genus, 36 species were recognized. At least nine more species have been described since then, and additional revisionary work has subsumed several other genera into Anoplophora, so it includes over 50 species at present.

Species

Anoplophora albopicta (Matsushita, 1933)
Anoplophora amoena (Jordan, 1895)
Anoplophora ankangensis (Chiang, 1981)
Anoplophora asuanga Schultze, 1923
Anoplophora beryllina (Hope, 1840)
Anoplophora birmanica Huedepohl, 1990
Anoplophora bowringii (White, 1858)
Anoplophora cheni Bi & Ohbayashi, 2015
Anoplophora chiangi Hua & Zhang, 1991
Anoplophora chinensis (Forster, 1771)
Anoplophora coeruleoantennata (Breuning, 1946)
Anoplophora davidis (Fairmaire, 1886)
Anoplophora decemmaculata Pu, 1999
Anoplophora elegans (Gahan, 1888)
Anoplophora fanjingensis Yang, Yang & Tian, 2020
Anoplophora flavomaculata (Gressitt, 1935)
Anoplophora freyi (Breuning, 1946)
Anoplophora fruhstorferi (Aurivillius, 1902)
Anoplophora glabripennis (Motschulsky, 1854)
Anoplophora graafi (Ritsema, 1880)
Anoplophora granata Holzschuh, 1993
Anoplophora gressitti Ohbayashi & Bi, 2014
Anoplophora horsfieldii (Hope, 1842)
Anoplophora huangjianbini Wang & He, 2021
Anoplophora imitator (White, 1858)
Anoplophora irregularis (Aurivillius, 1924)
Anoplophora jianfenglingensis Hua, 1989
Anoplophora leechi (Gahan, 1888)
Anoplophora longehirsuta Breuning, 1968
Anoplophora lucipor Newman, 1842
Anoplophora lurida (Pascoe, 1857)
Anoplophora macularia (Thomson, 1865)
Anoplophora mamaua Schultze, 1923
Anoplophora medenbachii (Ritsema, 1881)
Anoplophora multimaculata (Xie & Wang, 2015)
Anoplophora ogasawaraensis Makihara, 1976
Anoplophora oshimana (Fairmaire, 1895)
Anoplophora puxian Wang & He, 2021
Anoplophora quadrifasciata (Breuning, 1961)
Anoplophora rubidacorpora Xie, Shi & Wang, 2015
Anoplophora ryukyuensis Breuning & Ohbayashi, 1964
Anoplophora sebastieni Duranton, 2004
Anoplophora siderea Bi, Chen & Ohbayashi, 2020
Anoplophora similis (Gahan, 1900)
Anoplophora sollii (Hope, 1840)
Anoplophora stanleyana Hope, 1840
Anoplophora tianaca Schultze, 1923
Anoplophora tonkinea (Pic, 1907)
Anoplophora viriantennata Wang & Chiang, 1998
Anoplophora wusheana Chang, 1960
Anoplophora zonator (Thomson, 1878)

References

Further reading
Lingafelter, S. W. and E. R. Hoebeke. Revision of Anoplophora (Coleoptera: Cerambycidae). The Entomological Society of Washington, Washington, D.C. 2002. 238 p.

Lamiini